WBAJ (890 kHz) is an AM radio station licensed to Blythewood, South Carolina, and serving the Columbia metropolitan area.  WBAJ carries a Christian radio format and is owned by Bible Clarity, a Seventh-day Adventist organization.

WBAJ is a daytimer station.  By day it is powered at 50,000 watts, using a non-directional antenna.  But because AM 890 is a clear channel frequency reserved for Class A WLS Chicago, WBAJ must sign off at night to avoid interference.  During critical hours, WBAJ is powered at 8,500 watts.

Programming is also heard on 85 watt FM translator 105.9 W290CY in Columbia.

History
On October 8, 1999, the station signed on with its Christian radio format. It is owned by Linda de Romanett, through licensee Bible Clarity.

References

External links

Seventh-day Adventist media
BAJ
Radio stations established in 1999
1999 establishments in South Carolina
BAJ